Quinton "Rampage" Jackson (born June 20, 1978) is an American mixed martial artist, actor and former professional wrestler, who most recently fought in the Bellator MMA. He is a former UFC Light Heavyweight Champion and unified the Pride Middleweight Championship belt. Due to his eccentric personality and aggressive fighting style, Jackson became a star in Japan during his tenure with Pride FC and following his move to the UFC, he helped pioneer MMA's growth into a worldwide sport.

Background
Jackson is from Memphis, Tennessee and had a difficult childhood. He began selling drugs from a young age and was involved in many street fights. Jackson also had a dysfunctional family, as his drug-addicted father disappeared when Jackson was only 10 years old, before returning to his life in 2003. In high school Jackson also befriended fellow Bellator light heavyweight Jacob Noe, a karate practitioner who taught Jackson striking techniques, in exchange for wrestling techniques. Originally, Jackson intended to pursue a career in professional wrestling after graduating high school, but ultimately extended his amateur wrestling career at Lassen Community College in Susanville, California before being expelled after a fight with a teammate. After discovering mixed martial arts, Jackson trained in Las Vegas with BAMMA fighter Lewis Rumble.

Mixed martial arts career

Early career
Impressed by the success of other wrestlers in MMA, Jackson decided to try his own hand at the sport. Jackson built up a record of 10 wins and 1 loss fighting for a variety of smaller scale American promotions, including King of the Cage, Gladiator Challenge and Dangerzone. Jackson gained a reputation for lifting his opponents and slamming them to the mat. Jackson's successful  first MMA Title shot against Rocko Hammerhands Henderson proved to be the beginning of many upsets.

Pride Fighting Championships
In 2001, Japan's Pride organization marketed Jackson as a homeless person. Jackson, still a relatively unknown fighter, first was matched at Pride 15 against fellow wrestler and Japanese superstar Kazushi Sakuraba, who was at that time Pride's most prominent domestic fighter. Jackson lost due to a rear naked choke from Sakuraba. Jackson captivated the Japanese fans with his exciting performance and also gained their respect and admiration for his valiant effort against the much more experienced Sakuraba.

After beating pro-wrestler Alexander Otsuka in a fight for the Battlarts promotion, Jackson was invited back for Pride 17 where he scored a knockout victory over Otsuka's training partner, Yuki Ishikawa. In his next fight, Jackson was disqualified for a low blow against Daijiro Matsui.

Jackson went on to defeat Masaaki Satake, Igor Vovchanchyn, Kevin Randleman and Mikhail Illoukhine in successive Pride bouts. He also made forays into kickboxing with a pair of victories over kickboxer Cyril Abidi, under K-1 rules. The first kickboxing bout between Abidi and Jackson was on July 14, 2002. Many expected Jackson's wild style of striking would not translate into the K-1 ring, thinking he would be outclassed by such a schooled and disciplined striker as Abidi. Instead, Jackson overwhelmed Abidi from the opening bell, and knocked him down less than a minute into the bout. Jackson then scored a hard underhand right to the chin of Abidi, knocking him out at 1:55 in the first round.

Later in the year, Abidi wanted to prove that his loss to Jackson was a fluke, and faced him on the New Year's Eve Inoki Bom-Ba-Ye card, again under K-1 rules. Jackson laid a lot of criticism to rest by once again defeating Abidi, this time via decision. It would be Jackson's last kickboxing bout, as he returned to full-time MMA competition afterwards.

Rivalry with Wanderlei Silva

Around this time, Jackson began stating  his intentions to capture the Pride Middleweight (205 lb/93 kg) title from Wanderlei Silva. In the opening round of Pride's 2003 Middleweight Grand Prix, Jackson won a split decision over Murilo Bustamante. Three months later, Jackson defeated UFC fighter Chuck Liddell in the tournament's semi-finals at Pride Final Conflict 2003 by corner stoppage, putting him in place to battle Silva in the tournament finals that night. After taking Wanderlei Silva down and bloodying him, a stand-up was called by the referee and Jackson was stopped with a series of heavy knees to the head, leading to a referee stoppage.

Jackson continued his Pride career with a TKO victory over Ikuhisa Minowa at Pride Shockwave 2003. He then faced Ricardo Arona at Pride Critical Countdown 2004 with the winner to face Wanderlei Silva. Late in the first round Arona caught Jackson in a triangle choke, Jackson picked up Arona and powerbombed him into the canvas, earning the KO win.

Prior to his rematch with Silva, Jackson made headlines with the public announcement of his conversion to Christianity. In the fight itself, Jackson floored Silva in the opening round and later scored a takedown which led to a series of knees and elbows at the end of the round. Jackson scored another takedown in the second round, but Silva escaped to his feet and proceeded to knock out Jackson with multiple knee strikes to the head.

Final bouts with Pride Fighting Championships
Jackson's next two bouts were against Silva's Chute Boxe training camp partners. He won a split decision over Murilo "Ninja" Rua, but fell to Rua's younger brother, Shogun Rua, via TKO soccer kicks to the head 

Soon after his loss to Shogun, Jackson was contacted by veteran boxing and MMA trainer Juanito Ibarra, who saw potential in Jackson's natural abilities but viewed his reputation as a hindrance. After a short conversation, Jackson entrusted Ibarra, a fellow born again Christian, with the managerial and training direction of his career.

Jackson then defeated Hirotaka Yokoi via TKO at Pride 30. In his final fight for Pride he won a unanimous decision over Yoon Dong-Sik at Pride 31

After Pride
On May 16, 2006, the World Fighting Alliance announced it had signed Jackson to a multi-fight deal. He defeated Matt Lindland by split decision at WFA: King of the Streets on July 22, 2006. "He is a good fighter", Jackson said. "I trained hard. He is an Olympic silver medalist. So much respect to him. I knew I had to bring it." He was caught in guillotine choke holds twice. Jackson managed to get out both times, and slammed Lindland a few times before cutting the bridge of his nose with ground and pound on his way to the win.

Ultimate Fighting Championship
On December 11, 2006, Zuffa, the parent company of the UFC, announced it had acquired select assets from the World Fighting Alliance, which ceased operations as part of their sales agreement. Jackson's WFA contract was one of the assets acquired.

In an interview on the UFC program Inside the UFC, Jackson said it was finally time for him to enter the organization, and that he had not before because of his friendship with UFC fighter Tito Ortiz. Jackson said that because Ortiz was one of the biggest stars in the UFC, and that both were fighters in the same weight class, he did not want to interfere.

Jackson made his UFC debut at UFC 67, where he knocked out Marvin Eastman, avenging an early career loss.

Winning the Light Heavyweight Championship 
At UFC 71 on May 26, 2007, Jackson faced UFC Light Heavyweight Champion Chuck Liddell in a title rematch of their 2003 Pride bout. Approximately 90 seconds into the first round, Jackson caught Liddell with a right hook to the jaw that sent him down to the mat, where Jackson landed a few more clean shots on the ground before a referee stoppage at 1:53 seconds to capture the UFC Light Heavyweight title.

Jackson then defeated Pride Middleweight Champion Dan Henderson at UFC 75, on September 8, 2007, in London, England via unanimous decision to unify the two organizations' titles.

The Ultimate Fighter 7
On December 9, 2007, it was announced by Dana White at Spike TV's Video Game Awards show that Jackson will be one of the two coaches of The Ultimate Fighter 7. At the conclusion of the season, Jackson fought the other coach and number one contender Forrest Griffin at UFC 86. During the show, Jackson showed his temper after his fighters repeatedly lost to Team Forrest. Going into the semifinals, only two of Jackson's original fighters made the cut while Griffin had 6 of his fighters advance. In the finale, Team Forrest's pick, Amir Sadollah beat Team Rampage's top fighter C.B. Dollaway via armbar in the first round.

On July 5, 2008, he fought Griffin for the light heavyweight championship at UFC 86 and lost a judges' decision. In the first round of the fight Jackson delivered two solid power punches, and soon after knocked Griffin down. Jackson tagged him throughout the fight. In contrast, Griffin pushed the pace of the fight from start to finish and stayed much more aggressive than Jackson for most of the fight with multiple leg kicks and by mounting Quinton and landing elbows and punches to his head. In later rounds Jackson managed to take Griffin down twice and work his own ground game, almost executing his signature power bomb. Many took note as Jackson was showing obvious discomfort from the effects of the leg kicks. The next three rounds were described by Sherdog as "somewhat uneventful" with Jackson searching for the knockout punch while Griffin threw whatever he could with long jabs, leg and body kicks. Griffin was awarded a unanimous decision.

After the fight both Griffin and his coach Randy Couture expressed that they thought the fight was close, and Jackson's coach, Juanito Ibarra, had planned to protest the unanimous decision with the Nevada State Athletic Commission. However, after speaking with the commission about his complaint, he decided not to file because he was informed that even if the judges scores were changed to his satisfaction, the fight would still result in a victory for Griffin by a majority decision. Soon after the fight, Jackson fired his longtime trainer/manager Ibarra. There were talks of an immediate rematch after the fight.

Following the loss of his belt, Quinton was involved in a hit and run incident and a high speed police pursuit in Newport Beach, California, charges followed to which he would plead guilty.

Back to title contention
Jackson began training for his next fight at UFC 92, which would be against Wanderlei Silva, the only man to defeat Jackson twice. Jackson avenged his previous defeats by knocking Silva out with a vicious left hook in the first round. The fight was notable for some controversy surrounding the conclusion of the match, as Jackson followed Silva to the ground with another three punches before referee Yves Lavigne called the fight. Yves was unsuccessful at protecting Silva from the second and third punches.

Jackson's next fight was against Keith Jardine at UFC 96 on March 7, 2009. It was announced before the fight that if Jackson won he would fight Rashad Evans for the Light Heavyweight Championship and if he lost Lyoto Machida would fight for the title instead. Jackson then won the fight by unanimous decision. Jackson was on track to get his title shot but lingering injuries kept him from fighting. Lyoto Machida received the title shot and Evans was expected to defend his belt as the main event instead; Jackson had stated he would like to fight Rashad, however, he suffered torn ligaments in his jaw that will require surgery and five weeks of no contact. Therefore, Lyoto Machida replaced Jackson, and Jackson was expected to fight the winner of the Machida vs. Evans bout, though that fight never came to fruition.

The Ultimate Fighter: Heavyweights
Production of the tenth series of The Ultimate Fighter reality series began in June 2009 with Jackson coaching opposite former UFC Light Heavyweight Champion Rashad Evans. The season, featuring 16 heavyweight competitors including internet street fighter Kevin "Kimbo Slice" Ferguson, the former IFL Heavyweight Champion Roy "Big Country" Nelson and former NFL players, made its premiere on Spike TV on September 16 with the finale scheduled for December 5.

Retirement and return
On September 22, 2009, Jackson wrote in a blog on his website that he was "done fighting", due to maltreatment by the UFC.
On December 4, 2009, Jackson informed the community via his web blog that he would return to the UFC to finish his contract and wanted to fight Rashad Evans.
At the UFC 107 press conference, Dana White stated that if Rashad Evans could defeat Thiago Silva at UFC 108, then a fight between Evans and Jackson would finally come to fruition.

Jackson was expected to finally face Rashad Evans at UFC 113, but the bout was scheduled for May 29, 2010, at UFC 114. UFC President Dana White had officially confirmed that the fight against Rashad Evans would determine who would challenge Maurício Rua in his first UFC Light Heavyweight Championship defense. Jackson ended up losing to Rashad Evans via unanimous decision. Jackson was tagged in the opening moments and spent the next two rounds being taken down before hurting Evans in the third, but was unable to finish him.

Return to title contention
On March 24, 2010, Dana White announced that Jackson signed a new six fight contract with the UFC. Jackson's next fight was against former UFC light heavyweight champion Lyoto Machida at UFC 123 on November 20, 2010. At UFC 123, Jackson met Machida in the main event. Jackson went on to win by a controversial split decision. UFC president Dana White put all doubts to rest and supported the judges' decision, saying that Jackson won the first two rounds and no rematch would be needed.

Jackson was expected to face Thiago Silva on May 28, 2011, at UFC 130. However, Silva tested positive for banned substances in his UFC 125 post fight drug test and was replaced by Matt Hamill. Jackson put on a dominant display, easily defending the decorated wrestler's takedowns and winning the striking exchanges. He won the fight via unanimous decision.

Second title shot 
Jackson faced Jon Jones for the UFC Light Heavyweight Championship on September 24, 2011 at UFC 135. Jackson lost by submission in the fourth round after Jones applied a rear-naked choke. The loss marks the first time Jackson had been finished during his run in the UFC.

Post-title shot
Jackson faced Ryan Bader on February 26, 2012 at UFC 144. Jackson missed the light heavyweight weight allowance of 206 lbs by 5 lbs; weighing in at 211 lbs for UFC 144. He cited a training injury that prevented him from doing road work. Bader accepted the fight at catchweight and received 20% of Jackson's purse. Jackson lost the fight via unanimous decision; it was the first time he had suffered two consecutive losses. Following the match Jackson tweeted that he was leaving the UFC after his loss to Bader. He was planning to face former Pride rival, Shogun Rua as his last UFC fight, but opted to have double knee surgery.

Jackson was expected to face Glover Teixeira on October 13, 2012 at UFC 153.  However, Jackson pulled out of the bout citing an injury and was replaced by Fábio Maldonado.

Jackson fought Teixeira and lost by unanimous decision on January 26, 2013 at UFC on Fox 6.

Bellator MMA 
On June 4, 2013, it was announced Jackson had signed multi-year deal with the partnership of Spike TV, Bellator MMA and Total Nonstop Action Wrestling. During a press conference he stated that he might move up to the heavyweight division.

Jackson was expected to face former training partner and fellow former UFC Light Heavyweight Champion Tito Ortiz on November 2 at Bellator 106. However, on October 25, Bellator announced Ortiz suffered a neck injury and had to pull out of his fight with Jackson.

Jackson made his Bellator debut on November 15, 2013 at Bellator 108 where he faced Joey Beltran. He won via knockout in round 1 after dropping Beltran with a left-right hook combination and following up with another right hand on the ground, stopping the action with 1 second left in the round.

Jackson next faced former Bellator Champion Christian M'Pumbu on February 28, 2014 in the Season 10 Light Heavyweight Tournament at Bellator 110 in the semifinals. He won via knockout in the first round.

Jackson faced Muhammed Lawal in the tournament final for a title shot on May 17, 2014, at Bellator 120. He won the fight via unanimous decision. After the fight Mississippi Athletic Commission fined Jackson $10,000 due to his shove at Lawal during the pre-fight weigh-in staredown. According to head of MAC Jon Lewis, he was about to pull Jackson out of the fight for insulting him due to the issued fine.

Return to the UFC
On December 20, 2014, during the main card broadcast of UFC Fight Night: Machida vs. Dollaway, it was announced that Jackson had signed a new deal to return to the UFC. Scott Coker, Bellator's president, alleged that Jackson was still under contract with Bellator and they would pursue legal process to ensure that. Jackson claimed that Bellator did not honor his contract and that's the reason he signed with the UFC.

Jackson was scheduled to face Fábio Maldonado on April 25, 2015 at UFC 186.  However, on April 7, Jackson was removed from the card after his most recent employer Bellator MMA was granted an injunction by a New Jersey Superior Court judge preventing him from competing for the UFC after it was alleged that he breached a deal signed in June 2013. On April 21, a judge in the Superior Court of New Jersey's Appellate Division overturned the injunction against Jackson, allowing him to compete for the UFC. The bout took place at a catchweight of 215 lbs. Jackson won the fight by unanimous decision.

Return to Bellator MMA
Following his lone fight for Zuffa, it was announced on February 16, 2016 that Jackson had settled the contractual disputes with Bellator MMA and would be returning to the promotion. During this time at Bellator, Jackson brought on the expertise of celebrity sports nutritionist Edwina Cheer to advise him on all aspects of nutrition on fight preparation and leading up to, and including, the weight cut. Known for his particular eating habits, Jackson thanked Cheer, stating  "I know I'm hard to deal with".

Jackson fought Satoshi Ishii on June 24, 2016 at Bellator 157. He won via split decision.

Jackson faced Muhammed Lawal at Bellator 175 on March 31, 2017. The fight was a rematch from their first fight at Bellator's inaugural pay-per-view, Bellator 120, which Jackson won via decision. He lost the fight via unanimous decision.

On November 9, 2017, Jackson re-signed a multi-fight contract with Bellator.

Jackson faced Chael Sonnen in the quarterfinals of the Bellator Heavyweight World Grand Prix Tournament on January 20, 2018 at Bellator 192. He lost the fight via unanimous decision.

On June 25, 2018, it was announced that Jackson would fight Wanderlei Silva in a rematch on September 29 at Bellator 206. He won the fight via technical knockout in round two.

On October 9, 2019, Bellator MMA announced that Jackson would face Fedor Emelianenko on December 29, 2019 at a Bellator and Rizin co-produced event in Japan. Jackson lost the bout via first round knockout. The bout marked the last fight of his contract with Bellator, who opted not to re-sign Jackson, making him a free agent.

Professional wrestling career

Total Nonstop Action Wrestling (2013–2014)
Jackson made his TNA debut on the June 6, 2013 episode of Impact Wrestling, getting into a verbal confrontation with Kurt Angle. The following week, Jackson saved Angle from an attack from the villainous Aces & Eights stable. Jackson returned on the July 11 episode of Impact Wrestling, being revealed as the fifth member of  New Main Event Mafia along with Angle, Magnus, Samoa Joe, and Sting. On July 18, during the Destination X episode of Impact Wrestling, the Main Event Mafia achieved their goal of getting the TNA World Heavyweight Championship off of Bully Ray and out of Aces & Eights' hands after stopping them from interfering in Ray's match with Chris Sabin. After Angle took a leave of absence in August, Jackson attempted to recruit his Bellator 106 opponent Tito Ortiz to sub for him. Ortiz later attacked Jackson by hitting him in the head with a hammer, which  helped Bully Ray regain the World Heavyweight Championship and go on to join Aces & Eights. Jackson made his in-ring debut in a five-on-five tag team match on the August 22 episode of Impact Wrestling; The Main Event Mafia (Jackson, Magnus, Joe, and Sting) and A.J. Styles defeated Aces & Eights after Styles pinned Devon for the win, forcing him out of TNA in the process. On September 12 at No Surrender, it was announced that Bellator MMA had pulled Jackson from TNA programming due to his upcoming PPV fight with Ortiz, thus removing him from the Main Event Mafia.

On July 31, 2014, in an interview with The Fight Nerd, Jackson stated that he was done with TNA after he saw their operations and how "they ran things". TNA has since moved his profile to the alumni section and doing so confirming his departure from the company.

Championships and accomplishments

Bellator MMA
Bellator Season 10 Light Heavyweight Tournament Championship
Pride Fighting Championships
2003 Pride Middleweight Grand Prix (Runner-up)
Ultimate Fighting Championship
UFC Light Heavyweight Championship (One time)
One successful title defense
 Unified the  UFC Light Heavyweight and Pride World Middleweight Championships 
Fight of the Night (Three times) vs. Forrest Griffin, Keith Jardine, Jon Jones
Knockout of the Night (Two times) vs. Chuck Liddell, Wanderlei Silva
Wrestling Observer Newsletter awards
2004 Fight of the Year vs. Wanderlei Silva on October 31
2008 Fight of the Year  vs. Forrest Griffin on July 5
2007 Most Outstanding Fighter
Sherdog
2007 Fighter of the Year
Mixed Martial Arts Hall of Fame

Mixed martial arts record

|-
|Loss
|align=center|38–14
|Fedor Emelianenko
|TKO (punches)
|Bellator 237
|
|align=center|1
|align=center|2:44
|Saitama, Japan
|
|-
|Win
|align=center|38–13
|Wanderlei Silva
|TKO (punches)
|Bellator 206
|
|align=center|2
|align=center|4:32
|San Jose, California, United States
|
|-
|Loss
|align=center|37–13
|Chael Sonnen
|Decision (unanimous)
|Bellator 192
|
|align=center|3
|align=center|5:00
|Inglewood, California, United States
|
|-
|Loss
|align=center|37–12
|Muhammed Lawal
|Decision (unanimous)
|Bellator 175
|
|align=center|3
|align=center|5:00
|Rosemont, Illinois, United States
|
|-
|Win
|align=center|37–11
|Satoshi Ishii
|Decision (split)
|Bellator 157: Dynamite 2
|
|align=center|3
|align=center|5:00
|St. Louis, Missouri, United States
|
|-
|Win
|align=center|36–11
|Fábio Maldonado
|Decision (unanimous)
|UFC 186
|
|align=center|3
|align=center|5:00
|Montreal, Quebec, Canada
|
|-
| Win
| align=center| 35–11
| Muhammed Lawal
| Decision (unanimous)
| Bellator 120
| 
| align=center| 3
| align=center| 5:00
| Southaven, Mississippi, United States
| 
|-
| Win
| align=center| 34–11
| Christian M'Pumbu
| KO (punches)
| Bellator 110
| 
| align=center| 1
| align=center| 4:34
| Uncasville, Connecticut, United States
| 
|-
| Win
| align=center| 33–11
| Joey Beltran
| TKO (punches)
| Bellator 108
| 
| align=center| 1
| align=center| 4:59
| Atlantic City, New Jersey, United States
| 
|-
| Loss
| align=center| 32–11
| Glover Teixeira
| Decision (unanimous)
| UFC on Fox: Johnson vs. Dodson
| 
| align=center| 3
| align=center| 5:00
| Chicago, Illinois, United States
| 
|-
| Loss
| align=center| 32–10
| Ryan Bader
| Decision (unanimous)
| UFC 144
| 
| align=center| 3
| align=center| 5:00
| Saitama, Japan 
|
|-
| Loss
| align=center| 32–9
| Jon Jones
| Submission (rear-naked choke)
| UFC 135
| 
| align=center| 4
| align=center| 1:14
| Denver, Colorado, United States
| 
|-
| Win
| align=center| 32–8
| Matt Hamill
| Decision (unanimous)
| UFC 130
| 
| align=center| 3
| align=center| 5:00
| Las Vegas, Nevada, United States
| 
|-
| Win
| align=center| 31–8
| Lyoto Machida
| Decision (split)
| UFC 123
| 
| align=center| 3
| align=center| 5:00
| Auburn Hills, Michigan, United States
| 
|-
| Loss
| align=center| 30–8
| Rashad Evans
| Decision (unanimous)
| UFC 114
| 
| align=center| 3
| align=center| 5:00
| Las Vegas, Nevada, United States
| 
|-
| Win
| align=center| 30–7
| Keith Jardine
| Decision (unanimous)
| UFC 96
| 
| align=center| 3
| align=center| 5:00
| Columbus, Ohio, United States
| 
|-
| Win
| align=center| 29–7
| Wanderlei Silva
| KO (punch)
| UFC 92
| 
| align=center| 1
| align=center| 3:21
| Las Vegas, Nevada, United States
| 
|-
| Loss
| align=center| 28–7
| Forrest Griffin
| Decision (unanimous)
| UFC 86
| 
| align=center| 5
| align=center| 5:00
| Las Vegas, Nevada, United States
| 
|-
| Win
| align=center| 28–6
| Dan Henderson
| Decision (unanimous)
| UFC 75
| 
| align=center| 5
| align=center| 5:00
| London, England
| 
|-
| Win
| align=center| 27–6
| Chuck Liddell
| KO (punches)
| UFC 71
| 
| align=center| 1
| align=center| 1:53
| Las Vegas, Nevada, United States
| 
|-
| Win
| align=center| 26–6
| Marvin Eastman
| KO (punches)
| UFC 67
| 
| align=center| 2
| align=center| 3:49
| Las Vegas, Nevada, United States
|
|-
| Win
| align=center| 25–6
| Matt Lindland
| Decision (split)
| WFA: King of the Streets
| 
| align=center| 3
| align=center| 5:00
| Los Angeles, California, United States
| 
|-
| Win
| align=center| 24–6
| Yoon Dong-sik
| Decision (unanimous)
| Pride 31 – Dreamers
| 
| align=center| 3
| align=center| 5:00
| Saitama, Japan 
| 
|-
| Win
| align=center| 23–6
| Hirotaka Yokoi
| TKO (punches and stomps)
| Pride 30
| 
| align=center| 1
| align=center| 4:05
| Saitama, Japan 
| 
|-
| Loss
| align=center| 22–6
| Maurício Rua
| TKO (soccer kicks)
| Pride Total Elimination 2005
| 
| align=center| 1
| align=center| 4:47
| Osaka, Japan 
| 
|-
| Win
| align=center| 22–5
| Murilo Rua
| Decision (split)
| Pride 29
| 
| align=center| 3
| align=center| 5:00
| Saitama, Japan 
| 
|-
| Loss
| align=center| 21–5
| Wanderlei Silva
| KO (knees)
| Pride 28
| 
| align=center| 2
| align=center| 3:26
| Saitama, Japan 
| 
|-
| Win
| align=center| 21–4
| Ricardo Arona
| KO (slam)
| Pride Critical Countdown 2004
| 
| align=center| 1
| align=center| 7:32
| Saitama, Japan 
| 
|-
| Win
| align=center| 20–4
| Ikuhisa Minowa
| TKO (punches)
| Pride Shockwave 2003
| 
| align=center| 2
| align=center| 1:05
| Saitama, Japan 
| 
|-
| Loss
| align=center| 19–4
| Wanderlei Silva
| TKO (knees)
| rowspan=2| Pride Final Conflict 2003
| rowspan=2| 
| align=center| 1
| align=center| 6:28
| rowspan=2| Tokyo, Japan 
| 
|-
| Win
| align=center| 19–3
| Chuck Liddell
| TKO (corner stoppage)
| align=center| 2
| align=center| 3:10
| 
|-
| Win
| align=center| 18–3
| Murilo Bustamante
| Decision (split)
| Pride Total Elimination 2003
| 
| align=center| 3
| align=center| 5:00
| Saitama, Japan 
| 
|-
| Win
| align=center| 17–3
| Mikhail Ilyukhin
| TKO (submission to knee to the body)
| Pride 26
| 
| align=center| 1
| align=center| 6:26
| Yokohama, Japan 
| 
|-
| Win
| align=center| 16–3
| Kevin Randleman
| KO (knee and punches)
| Pride 25
| 
| align=center| 1
| align=center| 6:58
| Yokohama, Japan 
| 
|-
| Win
| align=center| 15–3
| Igor Vovchanchyn
| TKO (injury)
| Pride 22
| 
| align=center| 1
| align=center| 7:17
| Nagoya, Japan 
| 
|-
| Win
| align=center| 14–3
| Sean Gray
| TKO (punches)
| KOTC 13 – Revolution
| 
| align=center| 3
| align=center| 0:37
| Reno, Nevada, United States
| 
|-
| Win
| align=center| 13–3
| Masaaki Satake
| TKO (slam)
| Pride 20
| 
| align=center| 1
| align=center| 7:07
| Yokohama, Japan 
| 
|-
| Loss
| align=center| 12–3
| Daijiro Matsui
| DQ (knee to groin)
| Pride 18
| 
| align=center| 1
| align=center| 0:14
| Fukuoka, Japan 
| 
|-
| Win
| align=center| 12–2
| Yuki Ishikawa
| KO (punches)
| Pride 17
| 
| align=center| 1
| align=center| 1:52
| Tokyo, Japan 
| 
|-
| Win
| align=center| 11–2
| Alexander Otsuka
| TKO (doctor stoppage)
| BattlArts: BattlArts vs. the World
| 
| align=center| 2
| align=center| 5:00
| Tokyo, Japan 
| 
|-
| Loss
| align=center| 10–2
| Kazushi Sakuraba
| Submission (rear-naked choke)
| Pride 15
| 
| align=center| 1
| align=center| 5:41
| Saitama, Japan 
| 
|-
| Win
| align=center| 10–1
| Kenneth Williams
| Submission (rear-naked choke)
| Gladiator Challenge 4
| 
| align=center| 1
| align=center| 4:40
| Colusa, California, United States
| 
|-
| Win
| align=center| 9–1
| Bryson Haubrick
| TKO (submission to punches)
| KOTC 8 – Bombs Away
| 
| align=center| 1
| align=center| 1:48
| Williams, California, United States
| 
|-
| Win
| align=center| 8–1
| Dennis Henderson
| Submission (kimura)
| Gladiator Challenge 3
| 
| align=center| 2
| align=center| 1:15
| Friant, California, United States
| 
|-
| Win
| align=center| 7–1
| Dave Taylor
| TKO (corner stoppage)
| Gladiator Challenge 2
| 
| align=center| 1
| align=center| 5:00
| Colusa, California, United States
| 
|-
| Win
| align=center| 6–1
| Charlie West
| Decision (unanimous)
| Gladiator Challenge 1
| 
| align=center| 3
| align=center| 5:00
| San Jacinto, California, United States
| 
|-
| Win
| align=center| 5–1
| Rob Smith
| Decision (unanimous)
| KOTC 6 – Road Warriors
| 
| align=center| 2
| align=center| 5:00
| Mt. Pleasant, Michigan, United States
| 
|-
| Win
| align=center| 4–1
| Warren Owsley
| Submission (armbar)
| Dangerzone: Night of the Beast
| 
| align=center| 1
| align=center| 6:04
| Lynchburg, Virginia, United States
| 
|-
| Win
| align=center| 3–1
| Ron Rumpf
| TKO (punches)
| Continental Freefighting Alliance 2
| 
| align=center| 1
| align=center| 1:18
| Corinth, Mississippi, United States
| 
|-
| Loss
| align=center| 2–1
| Marvin Eastman
| Decision (unanimous)
| KOTC 4 – Gladiators
| 
| align=center| 2
| align=center| 5:00
| San Jacinto, California, United States
| 
|-
| Win
| align=center| 2–0
| Marco Bermudaz
| Submission (rear-naked choke)
| Huntington Beach Underground Pancrase
| 
| align=center| 1
| align=center| 7:17
| Huntington Beach, California, United States
| 
|-
| Win
| align=center| 1–0
| Mike Pyle
| Decision (unanimous)
| ISCF: Memphis
| 
| align=center| 3
| align=center| 5:00
| Memphis, Tennessee, United States
|

Pay-per-view bouts

Acting career 
Jackson has appeared in Confessions of a Pit Fighter, Miss March, Bad Guys,  The Midnight Meat Train, and Vigilante Diaries, as well as episodes of The King of Queens and Pimp My Ride. He starred in the films The A-Team, Never Surrender, Duel of Legends, and Death Warrior. He appeared in the Nike commercial, "Human Chain". Jackson also appeared on WWE Monday Night Raw on June 7, 2010, as a guest host.

Film and television credits

Personal life 
Jackson resides in Ladera Ranch and has five children. Three of his children have the middle name of Rampage. Jackson and his wife, with whom he has four children, separated in 2006 after a paternity test proved that he had fathered a child, with another woman in 2000. They have since divorced. Jackson suffers from low testosterone and undergoes testosterone replacement therapy. In 2010, Jackson lived in Merseyside in England.
He is an avid gamer, and streams in his free time on the streaming site Twitch.

Controversies 
In 2009, Jackson repeatedly humped cage reporter Heather Nichols during an interview on camera. Nichols later described the experience as "awkward", not knowing what to do to stop him. Also in 2009, in an interview with an unidentified Japanese reporter, Jackson gets on all fours and proceeds to bark, sniff, grab, grope and hump the reporter from behind, with the terrifed woman eventually squirming away.

In 2011, Jackson stuck his face in reporter Karyn Bryant's cleavage while simulating a sexual act, after making sexually explicit comments to her. Some condemnations followed, including an assessment of the incident as bordering on assault. In that same interview, Jackson went on to make light of his past indecent sexual advances by stating: "You know I've been humping reporters so you might want to get away... I've been in a long training camp. Get away. Get away before I hump you in front of everybody."

In 2012, Jackson starred in a satirical video entitled "How To Pick Up A Gurl – Fast", where he suggests the use of chloroform and zip ties, as well as sneaking up on women in parking lots while already wearing a condom. As a result, and for repeatedly denigrating women, several women's organizations called for the UFC to pull Jackson from his then upcoming bout against Glover Teixeira. Sharmili Majmudar, the executive director of Rape Victims Advocates, stated that "when you hear or you see people in prominent roles essentially echoing those messages that sexual violence is a joke or it's no big deal or it's funny, it just compounds that experience for victims."

In 2013, Jackson directed more highly inappropriate comments toward female reporter Karyn Bryant during an interview just days after a petition was published seeking Rampage's removal from the UFC.

Jackson has repeatedly persuaded his Asian fans to make homophobic remarks about themselves on camera.

Legal issues 
On July 15, 2008, 10 days after losing his belt to Forrest Griffin, Jackson was arrested in Costa Mesa and booked on suspicion of felony reckless driving, and felony hit and run after striking several vehicles. He led pursuing officers on a chase while driving on the wrong side of the street and on city sidewalks in his lifted Ford F-350 with his picture painted on the side. During the chase, one of the tires blew out on his truck and he continued to flee while driving on his rims. On July 18, 2008, UFC President Dana White gave an interview to Yahoo! Sports in which he said that Jackson had initially been detained for a 72-hour stay, but that had been extended. White was quoted as saying: "I think it's going to be a while before we get him back." White also claimed that before the detainment, Jackson did not sleep for four days, had not been eating, and had only been drinking energy drinks and became mentally ill from dehydration. According to White, no drugs were found in Jackson's system.

Jackson was charged with one felony count of evading police while driving recklessly, one felony count of evading police and driving against traffic, three misdemeanor counts of hit and run with property damage, and one misdemeanor count of reckless driving when he nearly hit several pedestrians. Jackson faced up to 3 years in prison if convicted. On August 28, 2008, he pleaded not guilty to all of the charges; however, on January 8, 2009, he pleaded guilty to one felony count of evading a police officer and driving against traffic, and one misdemeanor count of driving recklessly as part of a plea agreement. A judge dismissed the charges against Jackson on January 8, 2010, citing that he had successfully completed 200 hours of community service and complied with other terms and conditions.

One of the victims in the above police chase, filed a civil suit against Jackson and claimed that the impact of her abdomen with the steering wheel caused her amniotic fluid membranes to rupture, ultimately resulting in the stillbirth of her baby. She requested $25,000 in damages for property damage, personal injury, and emotional distress. Farrah Emami, Spokesperson for the DA's office, said: "We reviewed all the medical records and spoke with the victim's physician, and the evidence showed that the loss of the fetus was not related to or a result of the crash caused by the defendant."

In May 2010 the woman dismissed her lawsuit against Jackson.  It is unclear if the two sides reached a settlement.

In 2014, Jackson claimed that the reason of his reckless driving was trying to reach a friend's house in order to stop him from committing suicide.

See also
 List of male mixed martial artists

References

External links 

 
 
 Rampage Jackson at Bellator (archived)
 
 

1978 births
African-American Christians
American male mixed martial artists
American shooting survivors
Mixed martial artists from Tennessee
African-American mixed martial artists
Light heavyweight mixed martial artists
Mixed martial artists utilizing collegiate wrestling
Mixed martial artists utilizing karate
Mixed martial artists utilizing boxing
Living people
American male kickboxers
Kickboxers from Tennessee
Heavyweight kickboxers
Sportspeople from Irvine, California
Professional wrestlers from Tennessee
Sportspeople from Memphis, Tennessee
Sportspeople from Mission Viejo, California
Ultimate Fighting Championship champions
American male professional wrestlers
African-American male professional wrestlers
Professional wrestlers from California
People from Irvine, California
Male actors from Memphis, Tennessee
Bellator male fighters
Ultimate Fighting Championship male fighters
21st-century African-American sportspeople
20th-century African-American sportspeople